This is a list of recipients of the Victoria Cross by nationality. It does not include the Victoria Cross awarded to the American Unknown Soldier of World War I buried in the Tomb of the Unknowns in Arlington National Cemetery. He was awarded the VC posthumously in 1921. This gesture reciprocated the award of the Medal of Honor to the British Unknown Warrior.

The Victoria Cross (VC) is a military decoration awarded for valour "in the face of the enemy" to members of the British armed forces. A small number of Commonwealth countries still participate in the British (Imperial) honours system and would still be eligible to make Victoria Cross recommendations for their service personnel but none of these countries have ever been awarded the Victoria Cross. The last occasion a Commonwealth country was awarded the Victoria Cross was in 1969 during the Vietnam War and today all Commonwealth countries whose armed forces had been awarded the Victoria Cross under the British honours systems have their own honours systems and their own orders, decorations and medals. The Victoria Cross takes precedence over all other British orders, decorations and medals and may be awarded to a person of any rank in any service and although civilians under military command are eligible for the award none has been awarded since 1879. The Victoria Cross has often been presented to the recipient during an investiture by the British monarch. The last award of the reign of King George VI and all awards of the reign of the present Queen with the exception of the two posthumous awards to the Australian Army during the Vietnam War have been presented by Queen Elizabeth II. The VC has been awarded on 1358 occasions to 1355 individual recipients.

The original Royal Warrant and all warrants to this day contain both expulsion and restoration clauses. Eight recipients between 1861 and 1908 had their awards rescinded and although no award has ever been restored the names of the eight are included in the list. The original warrant did not contain a specific clause regarding posthumous awards, although official policy was to not award the VC posthumously. Between 1857 and 1901, twelve notices were issued in the London Gazette regarding soldiers who would have been awarded the VC had they survived. In a partial reversal of policy for the South African War 1899–1902, the next of kin of three of the soldiers were sent medals by registered post in 1902. In the same gazette the first three posthumous awards were awarded and also sent to the next of kin. In 1907, the posthumous policy was reversed and medals were sent to the next of kin of the six officers and men. The Victoria Cross warrant was not officially amended to explicitly allow posthumous awards until 1920 but one quarter of all awards for the First World War were posthumous.

For a short time in the middle 1800s, the VC was awarded for actions taken not in the face of the enemy. Six were awarded at this time for actions taken not in the face of the enemy. (Campbell Mellis Douglas was one of these recipients.)

Until 1921 the Victoria Cross could not be awarded to women, and to this day no VC has been awarded to members of that gender. With the approval of Queen Victoria, Elizabeth Webber Harris was awarded a gold VC for her valour in nursing cholera-ridden soldiers in India in 1869.

Most Commonwealth countries have now created their own honours systems. Since 1991, three Commonwealth countries; Australia, Canada and New Zealand have created their own operational gallantry awards. In each case, their highest award for most conspicuous bravery was named in honour of the British (Imperial) Victoria Cross; the Victoria Cross for Australia, the Victoria Cross (Canada) and the Victoria Cross for New Zealand. One Victoria Cross for New Zealand was awarded to Willie Apiata on 26 July 2007; four Victoria Crosses for Australia have been awarded to Mark Donaldson, Ben Roberts-Smith, Daniel Keighran and Cameron Baird. All five awards were for actions in Afghanistan. As these are separate medals, they are not included in this list.

Recipients are described in the following list by nationality (birthplace) or (citizenship) or (country of service) or (uncertain) or in the case of New Zealand born Captain Alfred John Shout of the Australian Army by both (birthplace) and (country of service). The country lists are compiled differently with the Australian list only being members of the Australian forces, the Canadian list being members of the Canadian forces including Danish Thomas Dinesen who served in Canadian Army plus others who are considered by Canadians as Canadian recipients, while the English list only includes a few of the many English born recipients who were decorated as members of Commonwealth and Indian forces. There have been 1355 individual recipients including the American unknown who is not listed but the list has 1356 names including Alfred John Shout and another listed twice.

Recipients by nationality

Notes

References